Bellahouston Academy is a non-denominational state-run secondary school in Bellahouston, south-west Glasgow, Scotland.

History
Bellahouston Academy first opened in 1876 as a private school run by Alexander Sim. It was taken over by the Govan School Board in 1885, and has been a state school ever since. The school buildings have recently been refurbished to provide for 1100 pupils.

The site of the Academy was donated by the Misses Steven of Bellahouston whose generosity also provided the clocktower, and the building was designed by a Bath Street architect, Robert Balde. The advertisement which announced the opening of the Academy described it as a 'Boy's High Class School and Ladies' College'. For its first nine years, the Academy struggled to function privately; this became increasingly difficult with the opening of new schools in the area which were supported by rates and government grants, despite such economies as dispensing with the office and salary of the rector. In 1885 therefore, the Academy ceased to be a private school, and was sold for £15,000 to Govan Parish School Board who added a swimming pool, one of the first in Scotland.

In 1901, the Institute was opened to train pupil-teachers, but when this system was replaced in 1907 by a junior system, the Institute became part of the Academy, which by now had become a Secondary School and Junior Student Centre. In 1905, the main building was renovated and a new gymnasium and baths were built.

In 1919, the Academy passed into the care of the new Glasgow Education Authority, which itself was replaced in 1929 by the Education Committee of the Corporation of Glasgow. In the 1930s, the Academy lost its title and was renamed Bellahouston Secondary School, but its name never changed locally, and like other schools, it was permitted to revert to its old title.

Roll
Attendance for  2010-2011 was 864.
Attendance in Oct 2022 is 1080.

New school 

In 1962, the modern building in Gower Terrace was opened and took in pupils and staff from Pollokshields Secondary, (a former rival, Albert Road Academy). In 1973, due to increasing numbers, the old building on Paisley Road West was re-opened. This building is now an Ethnic Minority Business Centre.

Pupils going to the school were disrupted by the building of the M8/M77 interchange which was completed in 1977. There was a major fire in 1991 in which part of the building was structurally damaged and had to be demolished. In 1996, the school returned to the refurbished main building, which is designed to hold 1,100 pupils.

Curriculum 

The school is non-denominational and co-educational, and the roll in Oct 2022 was 1080. The local Ibrox Complex is used to run league football; Bellahouston Ski Centre is used for ski-ing and snowboarding lessons. Golf is catered for at Haggs Castle Golf Course.

Glasgow School of Sport
Scotland's first school dedicated to sport has been developed at Bellahouston Academy. The Glasgow School of Sport aims to develop the talents of young sportsmen and women. The Sports Hall was completed in October 2002, and was opened by The Princess Royal in 2003. The School of Sport specialises in five sports - athletics; gymnastics; hockey; badminton and swimming. 120 pupils combine sports and studies at this specialised Academy which was visited by double Olympic Gold Champion, Dame Kelly Holmes. In 2005, the school's under-16 football team won both the Glasgow League and Scottish Cup Final at Firhill in the same season.

Notable former pupils

Adrian Beers - double bassist
Jack Bruce - musician and songwriter, former vocalist / bassist with Cream
Ian Durrant - ex Rangers, Kilmarnock, and Scotland footballer.
Elaine Gray - British Olympic swimmer, Montreal 1976 
Charles Hutton - architect and former Master of the Art Workers' Guild 
Jimmy Logan - entertainer, theatre owner, producer, director, and actor.
Tormod MacGill-Eain - entertainer, Gaelic singer, piper, novelist, broadcaster
Muzaffar Mahmood – cricketer, first Pakistani-born player to play for Scotland
Chris Rainbow - (Christopher Harley), musician and songwriter
Andy Roxburgh - former professional footballer and Scotland manager
Andy Scott - sculptor.
Sir John Thompson - judge
Russell Webb - guitarist with the Zones, The Skids, Armoury Show and Public Image Ltd.
Chick Young - sports journalist
Michael Jamieson - former swimmer graduated from Glasgow School of Sport, silver medalist in Olympic and Commonwealth Games
Morag Hood - Actress
Elaine McSporran (nee Roulston) SNP Glasgow City Councillor for the Cardonald Ward.Elected in 2017

References

External links
Bellahouston Academy blog
Glasgow School of Sport
 Bellahouston Academy's page on Parentzone

Secondary schools in Glasgow
Govan
Pollokshields
Educational institutions established in 1876
1876 establishments in Scotland